Killer Housewives is a 2001 Spanish comedy film directed by Javier Rebollo.

Plot 
The plot concerns a psychopathic housewife named Azucena  intent on killing her husband Felipe while infatuated with Pablo.

Cast

See also 
 List of Spanish films of 2001

References

External links
 

2001 films
Spanish comedy films
2000s Spanish-language films
2001 comedy films
2000s Spanish films